Jackpot or Jackpot! may refer to:

 A prize, such as a progressive jackpot
 Gardena jackpots, a poker variant
 Jackpot, Nevada, a community on the Nevada–Idaho state border

Comics
 Jackpot (comics), several comic book characters
 Jackpot (Fleetway comics), a 1979–1982 British comic book
 Jackpot Comics, a 1941 American comic book from MLJ Publications

Film
 The Jackpot, a 1950 comedy
 Jackpot (1960 film), a British crime film
 Jackpot (unfinished film), an unfinished film, filmed in 1974 and 1975, directed by Terence Young, starring Richard Burton
 Jackpot (1992 film), an Italian sci-fi-adventure film directed by Mario Orfini
 Jackpot (1993 film), an Indian Malayalam-language film directed by Jomon
 Jackpot (2001 film), an American comedy-drama directed by Michael Polish
 Jackpot (2006 film), an Indian Kannada-language romantic-drama film directed by Niranjan
 Jackpot (2009 film), an Indian Bengali-language film directed by Kaushik Ganguly
 Jackpot (2011 film), a Norwegian film of the 2010s
 Jackpot (2013 film), an Indian Hindi-language comedy thriller directed by Kaizad Gustad
 Jackpot (2015 film), a Vietnamese film
 Jackpot (2018 film), a Pakistani romantic comedy film
 Jackpot (2019 film), an Indian Tamil comedy film directed by Kalyaan
 Jackpot (2020 film), a German thriller film directed by Emily Atef

Literature
 Jackpot, a 1990 novel by Bill Pronzini
 Jackpot!, a 1995 novel by Alan Hunter
 The Jackpot, an apocalyptic event in William Gibson's 2014 novel The Peripheral

Music
 Jackpot (musical), a 1944 American musical
 Jackpot (Chingy album), 2003
 Jackpot! (Dave Brubeck album) or the title track, 1968
 Jackpot (Donna Ares album) or the title song, 2004
 Jackpot (Pietro Lombardi album), 2011
 Jackpot! The Best Bette, an album by Bette Midler, 2008
 Jackpot, an album by Jack the Lad, 1976
 "Jackpot" (song), by Boyfriend, 2016
 "Jackpot", a song by the Beat from I Just Can't Stop It
 "Jackpot", a song by Tocotronic
 "Jackpot", a song by Nikki Lane from Highway Queen

Television
 Jackpot (game show), an American and Canadian game show, in three different runs 1974–1990
 Jackpot (Irish TV series), a general knowledge quiz show 1962–1965
 Jackpot (1960 TV series), an Australian game show
 Jackpot (2016 TV series), a South Korean drama series
 "Jackpot" (CSI), an episode

See also
 Operation Jackpot (drug investigation), a federal task force during President Ronald Reagan's War on Drugs
 Operation Jackpot, several military operations
 Jackpotting, the hacking of an ATM to release all its cash